A tenet is a synonym for axiom, one of the principles on which a belief or theory is based.

Tenet may also refer to:

Media
 Tenet (band), a heavy metal band
 TENET (ensemble), an American early music vocal and instrumental group
 Tenet (film), a 2020 science fiction action-thriller film written and directed by Christopher Nolan
 Tenet (soundtrack), the soundtrack album to the film of the same name

Other
 Tenet Healthcare, a multinational investor-owned healthcare services company based in Dallas, Texas, United States
 TENET (network), the de facto national research and education network in South Africa
 TENET, one of the five words in the first-century Latin word puzzle, the Sator Square
 TENET 210, a mainframe computer designed for timesharing services
 George Tenet (born 1953), former Director of United States Central Intelligence Agency
 Tenet v. Doe, a U.S. Supreme Court case (2005) that decided whether certain spies could sue the C.I.A. or the government of the United States. George Tenet is represented in the name to the left of the V. (versus)

See also
 Tennet (disambiguation)